Kinrara Academy Oval was a cricket stadium located at Bandar Kinrara, Puchong, Selangor, near Kuala Lumpur, Malaysia. Constructed in 2003, it hosted its first recorded match in 2005 when Bhutan Under-17s played Kuwait Under-17s in the Asian Cricket Council Under-17 Cup. The ground was closed on 30 June 2022.

History
The ground hosted all seven matches in the 2006-07 DLF Cup played between Australia, India and the West Indies. All of the matches played had One Day International status. Despite having a capacity of 4,000 during these matches, only a few hundred spectators turned up to watch. Major international cricket hasn't returned since. In 2007, the ground hosted a Youth One Day International series between England Under-19s and Sri Lanka Under-19s, immediately following this series Sri Lanka Under-19s played India Under-19s there. The following year, Malaysia hosted the 2008 Under-19 World Cup and the Kinrara Oval hosted ten Youth One Day International matches during it, including the final between India and South Africa Under-19s, which India won.

In September 2011, the ground held seven matches in the World Cricket League Division Seven. In October 2014, the ground hosted seven matches in the World Cricket League Division Three.

In August 2017, it hosted matches for the 2017 Southeast Asian Games in Malaysia.

In June 2019, it was a venue of 2019 Malaysia Tri-Nation Series. Malaysia and Thailand both played their first matches with T20I status during this tournament, following the decision of the ICC to grant full Twenty20 International status to all its members from 1 January 2019.

Pakistan women's national cricket team had played some of their home matches at this venue during 2017–20 ICC Women's Championship.

The Hong Kong cricket team toured  Malaysia in February 2020 to play a five-match T20I series, known as the Interport T20 Series. All the matches were played at this venue. The series marked the return of the 154-year-old tradition of contests known as 'Interport' matches, a term historically used to refer to matches played between various British settlements in Southeast Asia, such as Hong Kong and Malaysia (and the Malay states that preceded Malaysia). The series was originally scheduled to be played at the Mission Road Ground in Mong Kok, Hong Kong, but was cancelled in early February due to the coronavirus pandemic in China. In January 2022, the stadium hosted the women's qualifier tournament for the 2022 Commonwealth Games.

On 30 March 2022, the Malaysian Cricket Association announced that they had been ordered to vacate the site due to arrears of more than 1.8 million Malaysian Rupees in disputed  assessment fees. Stripping of the stadium began the next day, with hundreds of assets being auctioned by the land owner Perumahan Kinrara Berhad.

List of Centuries

One Day Internationals

Men's One Day Internationals

Women's One Day Internationals

Twenty20 Internationals

Men's Twenty20 Internationals

List of Five Wicket Hauls

One Day Internationals

Men's One Day Internationals

Twenty20 Internationals

Men's Twenty20 Internationals

Women's Twenty20 Internationals

References

External links
Kinrara Academy Oval at CricketArchive

Cricket grounds in Malaysia
Sports venues in Selangor